Sungai Udang is a mukim and town in Melaka Tengah, Malacca, Malaysia. It is situated within the parliamentary constituency of Tangga Batu.

Education

Military bases

Tourist attractions

See also
 List of cities and towns in Malaysia by population

References

Central Melaka District
Mukims of Malacca